Ethiopia sent a delegation to compete at the 2008 Summer Paralympics in Beijing, People's Republic of China.

Athletics

See also
Ethiopia at the Paralympics
Ethiopia at the 2008 Summer Olympics

External links
International Paralympic Committee

Nations at the 2008 Summer Paralympics
2008
Summer Paralympics